The Ciutat Esportiva de Bunyol, is the training ground of the Primera Division club Levante UD. Located in the municipality of Bunyol 40 km west of València, it was opened in 2003.

The construction of the training centre started on 27 September 2002 by the efforts of the club president Antonio Blasco. Almost a year later on 26 June 26 2003, the Ciutat Esportiva was officially opened.

It occupies an area of 95,000 m2.

Facilities
The Central Stadium of the Ciudad Deportiva with a capacity of 3,000 seats, is the home stadium of Atlético Levante UD, the reserve team of Levante UD.
2 grass pitches.
4 artificial pitches.
1 indoor sports hall.
Service centre with gymnasium.

References

External links

Ciudad Deportiva de Buñol
Estadios de España 

Levante UD
Buñol
Sports venues completed in 2003